L. gouldii may refer to:
 Lophornis gouldii, the dot-eared coquette, a hummingbird species found in Bolivia and Brazil
 Lyonsia gouldii, Dall, 1915, a species in the genus Lyonsia and the family Lyonsiidae

See also
 Gouldii (disambiguation)